German submarine U-572 was a Type VIIC U-boat built for Nazi Germany's Kriegsmarine for service during World War II. Her keel was laid down 15 June 1940 at the Blohm & Voss yard in Hamburg as yard number 548. She was launched on 5 April 1941 and commissioned on 29 May.

Design
German Type VIIC submarines were preceded by the shorter Type VIIB submarines. U-572 had a displacement of  when at the surface and  while submerged. She had two shafts and two  propellers.

U-572 was fitted with five  torpedo tubes (four fitted at the bow and one at the stern), fourteen torpedoes, one  SK C/35 naval gun, 220 rounds, and a  C/30 anti-aircraft gun. The boat had a complement of between forty-four and sixty.

Service history
U-572 undertook nine patrols before it was sunk by an Allied marine aircraft in the Mid Atlantic in 1943.

The boat made an attempt to enter the Mediterranean but the commander gave up after a long period submerged in the heavy defences at Gibraltar and stated that he considered that his boat had been damaged and therefore he could not continue. However, Kapitänleutnant Heinz Hirsacker was reported by his senior watch officer for alleged cowardice. He was found guilty of "cowardice in the presence of the enemy" by courts marshall. On 24 April 1943 he committed suicide shortly before his execution. The U Boat was depth charged and sunk by a US Martin PBM Mariner from  VP-205 NE of Trinidad on 3 August 1943, in position . All 47 crew members died.

Wolfpacks
U-572 took part in eleven wolfpacks, namely:
 Brandenburg (15 September – 1 October 1941) 
 Störtebecker (5 – 19 November 1941) 
 Gödecke (19 – 26 November 1941) 
 Hai (3 – 21 July 1942) 
 Streitaxt (20 October – 2 November 1942) 
 Schlagetot (9 – 16 November 1942) 
 Falke (28 December 1942 – 19 January 1943) 
 Landsknecht (19 – 28 January 1943) 
 Hartherz (3 – 7 February 1943) 
 Seeteufel (21 – 30 March 1943) 
 Löwenherz (1 – 10 April 1943)

Summary of raiding history

References

Notes

Citations

Bibliography

External links

Ships lost with all hands
1941 ships
U-boats commissioned in 1941
U-boats sunk in 1943
U-boats sunk by US aircraft
World War II shipwrecks in the Caribbean Sea
German Type VIIC submarines
World War II submarines of Germany
Ships built in Hamburg
Maritime incidents in August 1943